Danza Pacino Hyatt (born 17 March 1983) is a Jamaican cricketer. A right-hand batsman and occasional medium pace bowler, Hyatt made his first-class cricket debut for West Indies B against Kenya in January 2004. He made his One Day International debut for the West Indies against India at Sir Vivian Richards Stadium in Antigua and Barbuda on 11 May 2011.

Hyatt was selected as part of the West Indies cricket team to tour England in 2011.

References

External links

1983 births
Living people
People from Saint Catherine Parish
Jamaican cricketers
Jamaica cricketers
West Indies One Day International cricketers
West Indies Twenty20 International cricketers
Jamaica Tallawahs cricketers
Rangpur Riders cricketers
Antigua Hawksbills cricketers
Leinster Lightning cricketers
West Indies B cricketers